Isabel Cueto was the defending champion, but lost in the first round to Federica Bonsignori.

Cecilia Dahlman won the title by defeating Rachel McQuillan 6–3, 1–6, 7–5 in the final.

Seeds

Draw

Finals

Top half

Bottom half

References

External links
 Official results archive (ITF)
 Official results archive (WTA)

Athens Trophy
1989 WTA Tour